Air Chief Marshal Sir Nigel Martin Maynard,  (28 August 1921 – 18 June 1998) was a senior Royal Air Force commander.

RAF career
Born the son of Air Vice Marshal Forster Maynard and educated at Aldenham School, Maynard entered the RAF College Cranwell early in 1940 but due to the demands of war his training was cut short and he was posted to No. 210 Squadron flying Sunderlands in June 1940. In 1949 he was appointed Officer Commanding No. 242 Squadron and then, following various staff appointments, he was made Station Commander at RAF Changi in 1960. He went on to be Group Captain, Operations at Headquarters Transport Command in 1962, Director of Defence Plans (Air) at the Ministry of Defence in 1964 and Director of Defence Plans in 1966. He was made Commandant of the RAF Staff College, Bracknell, in 1968 before being appointed Air Officer Commanding-in-Chief, Far East Air Force in 1970. In 1972 he was made Chief of Staff at Strike Command, in 1973 he took up the post of Commander-in-Chief, RAF Germany and in 1976 he became Air Officer Commanding-in-Chief, Strike Command. He retired at his own request on 21 May 1977.

Family
In 1946 he married Daphnie Llewellyn; they had one son and one daughter.

References

|-

|-

|-

|-
 

|-
 

1921 births
1998 deaths
Royal Air Force air marshals
Knights Commander of the Order of the Bath
Commanders of the Order of the British Empire
Recipients of the Distinguished Flying Cross (United Kingdom)
Recipients of the Air Force Cross (United Kingdom)
British World War II pilots
British World War II bomber pilots
People educated at Aldenham School